Mark Nigel Atkins (born 14 August 1968) is an English football manager and former professional footballer.

He was primarily a central midfielder but started out as right-back in a career that lasted from 1986 until 2004, notably in the Premier League for Blackburn Rovers where he won the title in 1995. He also played in the Football League for Scunthorpe United, Wolverhampton Wanderers, York City, Doncaster Rovers, Hull City, Shrewsbury Town and Harrogate Town.

Later on his playing career, Atkins was brielfly appointed as caretaker manager at both Doncaster and Shrewsbury, and in 2008 he was appointed as manager of non-league side Matlock Town, a position he held for six years.

Playing career
Atkins was an integral part of Blackburn's rise from the old Second Division to Premier League champions in 1995. He joined Rovers for £45,000 from Scunthorpe United in 1988, being then relocated to midfielder, and staying in the team despite the big investment in new players from owner Jack Walker.

His part in Rovers' championship success is often understated, with many falsely believing that David Batty formed the strong midfield partnership with club captain Tim Sherwood in that team. In fact, a foot injury kept Batty out until the final five matches and Atkins proved to be an unlikely hero for Blackburn, playing 34 matches and scoring six goals in the title season, including important ones against Liverpool and Southampton.

Atkins moved on from Rovers soon after the club's championship success, joining First Division Wolverhampton Wanderers in September 1995 for £1million. He was a first choice player throughout his time at Molineux as the club fought to reach the Premier League. He reached the play-offs with the team in 1996–97 but they lost 3–4 on aggregate to Crystal Palace, despite Atkins scoring in the return leg to give them a 2–1 win.

After four seasons with Wolves, Atkins was released in 1999, joining York City in the fourth tier on a three-month contract. After leaving this expired, he had an unsuccessful trial at Reading, before training with Conference side Doncaster Rovers, who subsequently offered him a deal. He remained at Doncaster for the next two seasons, and served as joint caretaker-manager (with Dave Penney) for the final five fixtures of the 1999–2000 campaign after the sacking of Ian Snodin.

Atkins returned to a purely playing role during the next season, which ended with him being loaned out to Hull City for the run-in. He helped the club reach the Third Division play-offs, but was denied a Wembley final by Leyton Orient's 2–1 aggregate triumph.

He joined Shrewsbury Town in July 2001, enjoying a decent ninth-placed finish to his first season at Gay Meadow. The 2002–03 season was one of mixed fortunes for the Shrews, from the highs of runs to the fourth round of the FA Cup and area final of the Football League Trophy to the lows of seven successive defeats, resulting in relegation to the Conference.

Coaching & management career
Shrewsbury manager Kevin Ratcliffe resigned with one game remaining of the season, and Atkins took charge of the team as they attempted to restore some pride in a home encounter against his original club Scunthorpe United. However, the Shrews succumbed to a 2–1 defeat, and Atkins left at the end of the season. He continued his playing career for one more season, at non-league level with Harrogate Town, also serving as their coach, before hanging up his boots for good in 2004.

Atkins remained assistant manager at Harrogate, but both he and manager John Reed left for Stalybridge Celtic in January 2005, from where they were later sacked in April 2007. He was appointed manager at Northern Premier League outfit Matlock Town, on 18 November 2008. He resigned along with assistant Nick Buxton on 4 October 2014 after a 4–0 defeat to Halesowen Town left Matlock Town joint bottom of the league.

He is now a summarisor for BBC Radio Lancashire.

Honours
Blackburn Rovers
Premier League: 1994–95

References

External links

Detailed Premier League Record at EPLInfo.com

1968 births
Living people
Footballers from Doncaster
English footballers
Association football midfielders
Premier League players
English Football League players
National League (English football) players
Scunthorpe United F.C. players
Blackburn Rovers F.C. players
Wolverhampton Wanderers F.C. players
York City F.C. players
Doncaster Rovers F.C. players
Hull City A.F.C. players
Harrogate Town A.F.C. players
Shrewsbury Town F.C. players
English football managers
Shrewsbury Town F.C. managers
Doncaster Rovers F.C. managers
Matlock Town F.C. managers